Dörmögő Dömötör (lit. Brumming Demetrius) is a fictional bear, created by Hungarian novelist Zsigmond Sebők in 1902 and comparable to Winnie the Pooh. Dörmögő Dömötör is also a children's magazine established in 1957 by state-owned Ifjúsági Lapkiadó. The magazine's mascot is the aforementioned bear, but it presents many different kind of stories, comics, puzzles, and others not related to the bear. The magazine is one of the best selling magazines of publisher Drize Publishing Ltd.

References

External links
 
The translator of Winnie the Pooh into Latin recalls his younger days.

Fictional bears
Hungarian novels
Magazine mascots
Bear mascots
Male characters in literature
Male characters in comics
Male characters in advertising
Literary characters introduced in 1902
Mascots introduced in 1957
Magazines established in 1957
Children's magazines
Magazines published in Hungary
Hungarian-language magazines
1957 establishments in Hungary